Mallika is a monotypic genus of butterflies of the subfamily Nymphalinae in the family Nymphalidae found in central Africa from DR Congo to Kenya. The single species is Mallika jacksoni, or Jackson's leaf butterfly, which traditionally has been included in the genus Kallima. The habitat consists of dry, sparsely wooded hillsides.

The rear surface of the wings is brownish and closely resembles a dead leaf, while the upper surface is mainly blue.

References

"Mallika Collins & Larsen, 1991" at Markku Savela's Lepidoptera and Some Other Life Forms
Seitz, A. Die Gross-Schmetterlinge der Erde 13: Die Afrikanischen Tagfalter. Plate XIII 50

Butterflies described in 1896
Butterflies of Africa
Kallimini
Taxa named by Emily Mary Bowdler Sharpe